"We Are One" (Urdu: Aae Khuda) is a global collaboration song produced by Kashan Admani in Dream Station Productions. The song features 40 musicians from seven countries, with the goal of extending a message of hope during the worldwide COVID-19 pandemic.

Lineup 
"We Are One" features the contributions of 40 musicians from seven countries. Grammy-winning violinist Charlie Bisharat, Grammy nominee Simon Phillips, bassist Stuart Hamm, percussionist Gumbi Ortiz, and drummer Taylor Simpson feature in the song from the United States. Other artists include Russian guitarist and composer Roman Miroshnichenko, Indian singer-songwriter Palash Sen, Brazilian actress and dancer Luiza Prochet, Canadian Matt Laurent, and UK singer-songwriter Lili Caseley.

Participating artists from Pakistan included Omran Shafique, Najam Sheraz, Bilal Ali (of Kashmir), Natasha Baig, Natasha Khan, Faakhir Mehmood, Ahsan Bari (Sounds of Kolachi), Farhad Humayun (Overload), Asad Rasheed (Mizmaar), Maha Ali Kazmi, Raafay Israr, Nazia Zuberi (Rushk), Farooq Ahmed (Aaroh, Ali Khan, Dino Ali, Salwa Najam, Babar Sheikh, Imran Akhoond, Khaled Anam, Nida Hussain, Amir Azhar, Faisal Malik, Meraal Hassan, Alex Shahbaz, Ashir Wajahat, Fahad Ahmed, Ammar Khaled, Eahab Akhtar, and Sabir Zafar.

Motive 
Kashan Admani, a Pakistani producer, composer, and guitarist, initiated the project of "a song that would be a united prayer" during the COVID-19 pandemic. The song was chosen to inspire hope and send a message of unity to the global population affected by COVID-19. Admani said in an interview with Arab News: "The idea was to talk about global unity in fighting the pandemic and praying to God for help. That's the reason why it's called 'We Are One', 'Aae Khuda.

Each artist recorded their audio and video parts in their home studios/recording facilities and sent them to Admani, who mixed the final track in his studio, Dream Station Productions.

The Urdu poetry of Aae Khuda was written by Sabir Zafar while the English poetry was written by Babar Sheikh.

References 

2020 songs
World music songs
Songs about the COVID-19 pandemic